Precedence  may refer to:

 Message precedence of military communications traffic
 Order of precedence, the ceremonial hierarchy within a nation or state
 Order of operations, in mathematics and computer programming
 Precedence Entertainment, a defunct American game publisher 
 Precedence (solitaire), a solitaire card game which uses two decks of playing cards
 Precedence, a brand of SPECT/CT scanner manufactured by Philips

See also
Precedent, a legal case establishing a principle to be adhered to in subsequent rulings